"Satisfied" is a song recorded by American singer-songwriter Richard Marx for his second album, Repeat Offender.  It was Richard's second of three consecutive number-ones on the Billboard Hot 100 singles chart.

Critical reception
In an ironic review on 10 June 1989, Betty Page, observer of British music newspaper Record Mirror, wondered along with readers why Richard Marx, with all the traits and skills of Bryan Adams, did not become as popular.

Track listing
All songs written by Richard Marx.

 "Satisfied" – 3:58 
 "Should've Known Better" [Live] – 4:57

Track 1 produced by Richard Marx and David Cole.
Track 2 produced by Humberto Gatica.

Charts
"Satisfied" was the lead single from Richard Marx's highly anticipated second album, Repeat Offender.  Heavy radio, video and retail attention led to the single's #39 debut on the Billboard Hot 100 singles chart, during the week of May 6, 1989.  The single steadily climbed to the top, reaching the #1 spot the week of June 24, 1989.  "Satisfied" was the first of five Top 15 singles from Marx's second studio album, which kept the artist on the singles chart consecutively for well over a year during 1989 and 1990.

Weekly charts

Year-end charts

Credits 
 Richard Marx – lead and backing vocals
 C.J. Vanston – keyboards
 Bill Payne – Hammond B3 organ
 Bruce Gaitsch – guitar
 Michael Landau – guitar, guitar solo
 Randy Jackson – bass
 Mike Baird – drums
 Paulinho da Costa – percussion
 Cynthia Rhodes – backing vocals

References

External links
 

1989 songs
1989 singles
Billboard Hot 100 number-one singles
Cashbox number-one singles
Richard Marx songs
Songs written by Richard Marx
Music videos directed by Dominic Sena
Capitol Records singles